Eurhodope incompta is a species of snout moth in the genus Eurhodope. It was described by Zeller in 1847, and is known from Greece, Crete, North Macedonia and Turkey.

References

Moths described in 1847
Phycitini
Moths of Europe
Moths of Asia